Battle of Vesontio may refer to:

 Battle of Vosges (58 BC)
 Battle of Vesontio (68)